Lancaster Municipal Building is a historic municipal building in Lancaster, Erie County, New York.  It is also known as Lancaster Village Hall, and was built in 1940.

It was listed on the National Register of Historic Places in 1999.  It is located in the Broadway Historic District.

References

External links
Lancaster Municipal Building - U.S. National Register of Historic Places on Waymarking.com
Welcome to the Village of Lancaster, New York

City and town halls on the National Register of Historic Places in New York (state)
Government buildings completed in 1940
Buildings and structures in Erie County, New York
National Register of Historic Places in Erie County, New York
Historic district contributing properties in Erie County, New York